Mission Drive is the generic street name. It may refer to:

United States 

By state, then city:

 Mission Drive (Howard County), Arkansas
 Mission Drive (Los Angeles County), California
 Mission Drive (Santa Barbara County), California
 Mission Drive (Johnson County), Kansas
 Mission Drive (Cole County), Missouri
 Mission Drive (Oglala Lakota  County), South Dakota

See also
Mission Road